Paolo Rosola (born 5 February 1957) is an Italian racing cyclist.

Major results

1981
1st Stage 2 Giro d'Italia
1983
Giro d'Italia
1st Stages 3, 15 & 18 
1984
1st Stage 12 Giro d'Italia
1st Milano–Torino
4th Milan–San Remo
1985
1st Stage 18 Giro d'Italia
1st Stage 6b Danmark Rundt
7th Milano–Torino
1986
1st Stage 3 Tour de Suisse
1st Stage 5a Settimana Internazionale di Coppi e Bartali
1987
Giro d'Italia
1st Stages 8, 10 & 20
1st Stage 2 Vuelta a España
Coors Classic
1st Stages 5, 11, 12b & 15
1st Stage 4 Settimana Internazionale di Coppi e Bartali
1988
1st Stage 10 Giro d'Italia
1st Stage 5b Danmark Rundt
1989
1st Grand Prix of Aargau Canton
1st Stage 3 Vuelta a Andalucía
6th Wincanton Classic

External links 

1957 births
Living people
Italian male cyclists
Italian Giro d'Italia stage winners
Cyclists from the Province of Brescia
Italian Vuelta a España stage winners
Tour de Suisse stage winners